Carlton William Barrett (November 24, 1919 – May 3, 1986), a native of Fulton, New York was a United States Army soldier who received the Medal of Honor for heroism near Saint-Laurent-sur-Mer, France on June 6, 1944, during the Normandy landings  (World War II).

Military service
Joined the United States Army from Albany, New York in October 1940. He was a member of, 18th Infantry, 1st Infantry Division. Barrett was one of four Medal of Honor recipients on D-Day, June 6, 1944.

He continued serving in the Army until June 1963, retiring with the rank of Staff Sergeant.

Medal of Honor citation
For gallantry and intrepidity at the risk of his life above and beyond the call of duty on 6 June 1944, in the vicinity of St. Laurent-sur-Mer, France. On the morning of D-day Pvt. Barrett, landing in the face of extremely heavy enemy fire, was forced to wade ashore through neck-deep water. Disregarding the personal danger, he returned to the surf again and again to assist his floundering comrades and save them from drowning. Refusing to remain pinned down by the intense barrage of small-arms and mortar fire poured at the landing points, Pvt. Barrett, working with fierce determination, saved many lives by carrying casualties to an evacuation boat lying offshore. In addition to his assigned mission as guide, he carried dispatches the length of the fire-swept beach; he assisted the wounded; he calmed the shocked; he arose as a leader in the stress of the occasion. His coolness and his dauntless daring courage while constantly risking his life during a period of many hours had an inestimable effect on his comrades and is in keeping with the highest traditions of the U.S. Army.

His medal ceremony took place at Paris, France on 17 November 1944, and he was decorated by Lt. Gen. John C. H. Lee, Deputy Theater Commander of the European Theater of Operations and Commanding General, Communication Zone, ETO.

Death
Carlton W Barrett died on May 3, 1986, and he is buried at Chapel of the Chimes Cemetery in Napa, California.

See also

List of Medal of Honor recipients for World War II

References

External links
 

1919 births
1986 deaths
United States Army Medal of Honor recipients
United States Army soldiers
People from Fulton, Oswego County, New York
United States Army personnel of World War II
Military personnel from Albany, New York
World War II recipients of the Medal of Honor
Battle of Normandy recipients of the Medal of Honor
Military personnel from New York (state)